Pierce College may refer to:
 Pierce College (Washington)
 Los Angeles Pierce College
 Pierce College station

See also
 Peirce College
 Franklin Pierce University